Jean Élie Octave Louis Sévère Amanien Decazes de Glücksbierg, 3rd Duc Decazes and 3rd Duke of Glücksbierg (April 30, 1864 – August 31, 1912), was a French aristocrat and sportsman.

Biography
Decazes was born in Paris. On April 28, 1888, still in Paris, he married Isabelle-Blanche Singer (1869–1896), who was the daughter of American sewing-machine millionaire Isaac Singer. They had three children:

 Louis Jean Victor Sévère (1889–1941). Had issue.
 Marguerite Séverine Philippine, best known as Daisy Fellowes (1890–1962). Had issue.
 Jacques Louis Élie Decazes de Glücksbierg (Paris, August 31, 1891 – Beaumont-en-Beine, March 15, 1916), unmarried and without issue.

After the suicide of his wife in 1896 their children were raised in large part by their aunt Winnaretta Singer, Princess Edmond de Polignac.

A member of the Yacht Club de France, Jean Decazes won a silver medal sailing at the 1900 Summer Olympics in the 10 to 20 ton class. The following year he captured the 1901 Coupe de France again using his sailboat Quand-Même II.

He died in Chantilly in 1912 aged 48.

References

External links

 
 

103
103
French male sailors (sport)
Sailors at the 1900 Summer Olympics – 10 to 20 ton
Olympic sailors of France
1864 births
1912 deaths
Sportspeople from Paris
Medalists at the 1900 Summer Olympics
Olympic silver medalists for France
Olympic medalists in sailing